U12 Intron Database (U12DB) is a biological database of containing the sequence of eukaryotic introns that are spliced out by a specialised minor spliceosome that contains U12 minor spliceosomal RNA in place of U2 spliceosomal RNA. These U12-dependent introns are under-represented in genome annotations because they often have non canonical splice sites. Release 1 of the database contains 6,397 known and predicted U12-dependent introns across 20 species.

References

External links
 https://genome.crg.cat/datasets/u12/

Biological databases
Gene expression
Spliceosome
RNA splicing